Kevin Dave Brown (born 1964), is a male former athlete who competed for England and Jamaica.

Athletics career
Brown was English national champion after winning the 1994 AAA Championships.

He represented England in the discus event, at the 1994 Commonwealth Games in Victoria, British Columbia, Canada. Eight years later he represented Jamaica in the 2002 Commonwealth Games.

References

1964 births
Athletes (track and field) at the 1994 Commonwealth Games
Living people
English male discus throwers
British male discus throwers
Jamaican male discus throwers
Commonwealth Games competitors for England